Jažince may refer to:
 Jažince, Štrpce, Kosovo
 Jažince, Jegunovce, North Macedonia